A  ("thousand-sheets"), also known by the names Napoleon, vanilla slice, and custard slice, is a dessert made of puff pastry layered with pastry cream. Its modern form was influenced by improvements made by Marie-Antoine Carême.

The top pastry layer is finished in various ways: sometimes it is topped with whipped cream, or it may be dusted with icing sugar, cocoa, pastry crumbs, or sliced almonds. It may also be glazed with icing or fondant alone, or in alternating white (icing) and brown (chocolate) or other colored icing stripes, and combed to create a marbled effect.

History

According to the Oxford Companion to Sugar and Sweets,  recipes from 17th century French and 18th century English cookbooks are a precursor to layer cakes.

The earliest mention of the name  itself appears in 1733 in an English-language cookbook written by French chef Vincent La Chapelle. The 18th century  was served stuffed with jam and marmalade instead of cream.

In French, the first mention of the  appears a little later, in 1749, in a cookbook by Menon:

To make a  cake, you take puff pastry, make out of it five cakes of equal size, & of the thickness of two coins, in the last one you shall make a hole in the middle in the shape of a Knight's cross, regarding the size you will base yourself on the dish that you will use for service, bake them in the oven. When they are baked & cooled, stack them one on the other, the one with the hole on top, & jams between every cake, [sentence unclear, maybe referring to covering all sides with jam] & ice them everywhere with white icing so that they appear to be a single piece; you can embellish it with some red currant jelly, candied lemon skins & pistachio, you serve them on a plate.

The word  is not used again in the recipe books of the 18th century. However, under the reign of Napoleon Bonaparte, several of the fanciest Parisian pastry shops appear to have sold the cake. During the 19th century, all recipes describe the cake as filled with jam, with the exception of the 1876 recipe by Urbain Dubois, where it is served with Bavarian cream.

According to Alan Davidson in the Oxford Companion to Food, the invention of the form (but not of the pastry itself) is usually attributed to Szeged, Hungary, where a caramel-coated  is called .

Composition
The top layer is coated with a sprinkling of powdered sugar. In later variations, the top is glazed with icing, in alternating white (icing) and brown (chocolate) strips, and then combed. Today, there are also savory , with cheese and spinach or other savory fillings.

It is often layered with fruits, most commonly strawberry and raspberry.

Variations

According to La Varenne, it was earlier called  ("cake of a thousand sheets"), referring to the many layers of pastry. Using traditional puff pastry, made with six folds of three layers, it has 729 layers; with some modern recipes it may have as many as 2,048.

In France, the pastry called Napoleon is made with two joined layers of  filled with frangipane.

Argentina
Rogel, A popular cake that is the Argentine variant of the French pastry mille-feuille It consists of various layers of puff pastry alternating with layers of dulce de leche and a top glazed with meringue. Rogel is considered a classic, and a wedding cake favourite.

Australia/New Zealand
It is made using a gelatin-set , and in many cases, passionfruit icing. "French Vanilla slice" refers to a similar product without fondant icing. In New Zealand, it is variously known as a 'custard slice', a 'custard square', a 'vanilla slice', or, with passion-fruit icing, a 'passion-fruit slice'.

Balkan countries

Belgium and the Netherlands
Several variations exist in Belgium, but in the Netherlands it has achieved an almost iconic status, with very little variation seen in form, size, ingredients and colour (always two layers of pastry, nearly always pink glazing, but orange around national festivities).

Canada
In Canada,  is often named , or 'Napoleon slice' in English Canada. It is sold either with custard, whipped cream, or both, between three layers of puff pastry; almond paste is the most common filling. A French Canadian method of making a  sees it made with graham crackers instead of puff pastry, with pudding replacing the custard layer.

German varieties
In the German speaking part of Switzerland and also in Austria, it is called . In Israel it is known by a variation of that name, .

Greece
In Greece, the pastry is called , a transcription of the word  using the Greek alphabet. The filling between the layers is cream whereas Chantilly cream is used at the top of the pastry.

Hong Kong

In Mainland China, a similar product also marketed as a Napoleon (or more commonly) varies between regions and individual bakeries, but usually features a top and bottom layer of rough puff pastry, typically made with vegetable shortening rather than butter, and a sponge cake and artificial buttercream filling.

Hungary
In Hungary, it is called .

Italy

A savory Italian version consists of puff pastry filled with spinach, cheese or pesto, among other things. Another important distinction of the Italian variety is that it often consists of a layer of puff pastry with layers of sponge cake as well (e.g. from bottom to top, puff pastry, sponge cake strawberries and cream and then puff pastry).

Iran
In Iran, the pastry is called  (literally "Napoleonic sweet pastry"). It consists of thin puff pastry and often topped with powdered sugar.

Lithuania
The recipe varies slightly as Lithuanians add layers of fruit filling such as apricots. It is often associated with weddings or celebrations and often given as gifts.

North Africa
In Tunisia, Morocco, and Algeria,  are consumed regularly and are known by their French name.

Philippines
In Philippines, they are called  (in the singular), and are made of two to three layers, with pastry cream or white custard as filling, topped with sugar glaze.

Poland

In Poland, the local variant of the pastry is officially called , and less commonly . It consists of two layers of pastry separated by a thick cream layer. The whole pastry is then covered with powdered sugar.

Russia
In Russian literature, a cake named 'Napoleon' is first mentioned as early as in the first half of the 19th century. Alexander Bestuzhev explained the emergence of such names by the romantic and historicist spirit of that time. The cake has enjoyed an especially great popularity since the centenary celebration of the Russian victory over Napoleon in the Patriotic War of 1812. During the celebrations in 1812, triangular-shape pastries were sold resembling the bicorne. The many layers of the cake symbolized La Grande Armée. In fact, the Russian "Napoleon" is an old receipt that has been revisited in 1925 by a pastry chef called Adrien Artigarrède, who added almonds from Crimea and icing sugar on the top (symbolizing the snow of Russia which helped the Russians defeat Napoleon). 

Later, the cake became a standard dessert in the Soviet cuisine. Nowadays, the Napoleon remains one of the most popular cakes in Russia and other post-Soviet countries. It typically has more layers than the French archetype, but the same height.

South Africa
In South Africa and Zimbabwe, it is called a 'custard slice'.

Spain
In the Spanish , the puff pastry is thin and crunchy.
In the central regions, "milhojas" usually have only two or three layers of puff pastry filled with very thick layers of whipped cream or chantilly.

Nordic countries
The top of the pastry is glazed with icing and currant jelly. In Denmark it is called  and in Norway , both meaning 'Napoleon cake'.

United Kingdom
In the United Kingdom, the pastry is most often called a 'vanilla slice', 'cream slice', or a 'custard slice', but can, on occasion, be named  or 'Napoleon' on branded products. It is common in the UK to only use two slices of pastry with a single, thick layer of filling between them.

United States
In the United States, the pastry is most often called 'Napoleon'. It typically includes three layers of pastry, is filled with pastry cream, and is glazed with icing sugar in a feathered or marbled pattern.

Other
In Latin American , various layers of puff pastry are layered with confectioner's sugar on top. A Colombian version of  has various layers of puff pastry and pastry cream. It is topped with arequipe (dulce de leche).

See also

 List of custard desserts
 List of Russian desserts
 List of French desserts
 Galaktoboureko
 Börek

Notes

References
https://parsiday.com/5766-napoleon-pastry/

Custard desserts
French pastries
Napoleon
Puff pastry
Soviet cuisine
Argentine cuisine
Australian desserts
British pastries
Canadian desserts
Greek pastries
Hong Kong desserts
Hungarian pastries
Italian pastries
Russian pastries
Lithuanian desserts
Moroccan pastry
Polish desserts
South African cuisine
Swedish pastries
Serbian cuisine
Bosnia and Herzegovina cuisine
Slovenian cuisine
Croatian cuisine
New Zealand desserts
American desserts